The Treasury Relief Art Project (TRAP) was a New Deal arts program that commissioned visual artists to provide artistic decoration for existing Federal buildings during the Great Depression in the United States. A project of the United States Department of the Treasury, TRAP was administered by the Section of Painting and Sculpture and funded by the Works Progress Administration, which provided assistants employed through the Federal Art Project. The Treasury Relief Art Project also created murals and sculpture for Public Works Administration housing projects. TRAP was established July 21, 1935, and continued through June 30, 1938.

Program

The Treasury Relief Art Project was created July 21, 1935, with an allocation of $530,784 from the Works Progress Administration. The project was conceived and overseen by Treasury Department arts administrator Edward Bruce. Artist Olin Dows was chief of the Treasury Relief Art Project; Cecil H. Jones, who later succeeded Dows, was assistant chief. Forbes Watson was director. Unlike the concurrent Treasury Section of Painting and Sculpture, TRAP was a work-relief program, subject to the income and employment standards of the WPA. The September 1935 announcement of the program estimated that it would employ 400 to 500 artists.

The principal mission of the Treasury Relief Art Project was to provide artistic decoration for existing Federal buildings. These projects could not be performed by the Section of Painting and Sculpture, which commissioned art for new construction using a percentage of the budget overseen by the Treasury Department's procurement division. The Treasury Relief Art Project was funded by the WPA. The Section supervised the creative output of TRAP, and selected a master artist for each project. Assistants were then chosen by the artist from the rolls of the WPA Federal Art Project.

As chief of the Treasury Relief Art Project, Dows was responsible for maintaining financial records for relief and non-relief personnel. A fixed proportion of all workers was to be taken from the relief rolls—initially 90 percent, but revised to 75 percent in December 1935.

Although it was regarded as a success, the Treasury Relief Art Project was ended June 30, 1938.

Projects

At a total cost of $833,784, 89 mural projects and 65 sculpture projects were completed under the Treasury Relief Art Project, as well as 10,000 easel paintings that were distributed to Federal offices.

Reginald Marsh was the master artist commissioned in 1937 to create a cycle of murals in fresco for the rotunda of the Alexander Hamilton U.S. Custom House. Marsh's team of assistants included Oliver M. Baker, Xavier J. Barile, Charles Bateman, Mary Fife, Lloyd Lozes Goff, Ludwig Mactarian, John Poehler, Erica Volsung and J. Walkley, students he knew from his teaching at the Art Students League. It was TRAP's most extensive and successful project in New York, encompassing 2,300 square feet.

Existing post office buildings that received TRAP artwork included the following:

 Beacon, New York
 Berkeley, California
 Cooperstown, New York
 Cranford, New Jersey
 Dover, Delaware

 East Liverpool, Ohio

 Eureka, California
 Freeport, New York
 Geneva, New York
 Hempstead, New York
 Hudson, New York
 Hudson Falls, New York
 Johnson City, New York
 Mount Kisco, New York
 New York General Post Office
 New York General Post Office Annex
 Nyack, New York
 Oyster Bay, New York
 Port Chester, New York
 Port Washington, New York
 Saratoga Springs, New York

 Trenton, New Jersey
 Ventura, California

In addition to producing artwork for Federal buildings, the Treasury Relief Art Project created murals and sculpture for Public Works Administration housing projects in Boston, Camden, Chicago, Cleveland, New York, Washington, D.C. and Stamford.

Artists
To maintain its high artistic standards, the Treasury Relief Art Project commissioned only a small number of artists—356 workers at its peak in 1936. Richmond Barthé, Ahron Ben-Shmuel, Paul Cadmus, Marion Greenwood, William Gropper, Reginald Marsh and Heinz Warneke were among the master artists who led projects. A complete list of projects and artists employed by TRAP is included in the final report held by the Smithsonian's Archives of American Art.

 Grace Greenwood Ames
 Frank Arno
 Oliver M. Baker
 Theodore Barbarossa
 Xavier J. Barile
 Richmond Barthé
 Giuseppe Bartoli
 Richmond Bartoli
 Charles Bateman
 Ahron Ben-Shmuel
 Emil Bisttram
 La Verne Nelson Black
 Clarence Bolton
 Daniel Boza
 Paul Cadmus
 Gustavo Cenci
 Edward Chavez
 Grant Wright Christian
 Lawrence Cupani
 James Daugherty
 Thomas Donnelly
 Aaron Douglas
 Elsie Driggs
 John Fabion
 Mary Fife
 Bernard Finestone
 Gladys Caldwell Fisher
 Gerald Foster
 Frederick Knight
 Robert Fuller
 Vincent Glinsky
 Lloyd Lozes Goff
 Gordon K. Grant
 Marion Greenwood
 William Gropper
 Rudolf Henn
 Ben Hoffman
 Bela Janowsky
 Robert Kaplan
 Charles Kassler
 Frederick Knight
 Thomas Laman
 Harry S. Lane
 Thomas Sergeant La Farge
 Dominic La Salle
 Frederico Lebrun
 Leo Lentelli
 Louis Lozowick
 Frank A. Machera
 Ann B. McNulty
 Ludwig Mactarian
 Jenne Magafan
 Peppino Mangravite
 Reginald Marsh
 Edgar Miller
 James D. Mitchel
 Domenico Mortellito
 Ann Rice O'Hanlon
 Morris Pass
 Channing Peake
 Guy Pène du Bois
 Ernest Peixotto
 Jacob Peltzman
 George A. Picken
 John A. Poehler
 Edna Reindel
 John T. Robertson
 Frank Romanelli
 Charles Rosen
 Victor Salvatore
 Susan Scheuer
 Arthur Schneider
 Leo Schulemowitz
 David Slivka
 Jacob G. Smeth
 Doris Spiegel
 Erwin Springweiler
 Algot Stenbery
 Abell Sturges
 Arthur A. Sturges
 Lorin Thompson
 Conrad Vasquez
 Gaetano Venezia
 Eduardo Villafrato
 Erica Volsung
 Winfield R. Walking
 Heinz Warneke
 William D. White

References

External links

 New Deal Artwork: Ownership and Responsibility—General Services Administration
 Treasury Relief Art Project selected administrative and business records, 1935–1939—Archive of American Art, Smithsonian Institution

 
New Deal projects of the arts
Works Progress Administration
American art
Murals in the United States
1935 establishments in Washington, D.C.
1938 disestablishments in Washington, D.C.
Work relief programs